KCLV-FM (99.1 FM, "Country 99") is a radio station licensed to serve Clovis, New Mexico.  The station is owned by Zia Broadcasting Company.  It airs a country music format.

History
99.1 went on air January 6, 1970, as KMTY-FM, the second FM for Clovis, owned by Friend Radio, Inc. The Frequently Modulated Radio Company acquired KMTY-FM in 1977 and changed its call letters to KKQQ the next year. The station was then assigned the KCLV-FM call letters by the Federal Communications Commission on December 2, 1981.

References

External links

CLV-FM
Country radio stations in the United States
Radio stations established in 1970
Clovis, New Mexico